, abbreviated FCG, is a keiretsu in Japan.  In 1991, it was the fourth-largest media company in the world and the largest one in Japan. In the same year, the company's yearly revenue was $5 billion. Many of its affiliates are owned by Fuji Media Holdings, itself a member of the Fujisankei Communications Group.

The Fujisankei Communications Group was created in 1967 as part of an agreement between the radio stations Nippon Broadcasting System and Nippon Cultural Broadcasting, the television broadcaster Fuji Television and the newspaper Sankei Shimbun. This media conglomerate was founded by Nobutaka Shikanai. "Fujisankei" is a portmanteau of Fuji Television and Sankei Shimbun.

In October 1989, Fujisankei Communications paid former United States president Ronald Reagan $2 million to help the company with public relations. Reagan toured Japan for nine days and made two speeches.

In 1991, Fujisankei Communications spent $50 million to found the Fujisankei California Entertainment, a film company. The film company was headed by Masaru Kakutani, who produced Antarctica and The Adventures of Milo and Otis, which were the two highest-grossing "domestically made" movies in Japan.

The group also has close links with the Hankyu Hanshin Toho Group; Toho Co. is the largest shareholder of Fuji Media Holdings and Hankyu Hanshin Holdings is the second-largest shareholder in Kansai Television, Fuji TV's affiliate station in the Kansai region (where Hankyu Hanshin Toho Group mainly operates).

Major companies 
This is a partial list of the  companies that constitute the Fujisankei Communications Group.

Fuji Media Holdings 
Although it is the core of the Fujisankei Communications Group, the holding company Fuji Media Holdings is just one of the 94 companies that makes up the keiretsu.

Many companies of the Fujisankei Communications Group, such as Fuji Television, Nippon Broadcasting System and Pony Canyon, are subsidiaries of Fuji Media Holdings. Other companies of the group, such as Sankei Shimbun, are owned in part by Fuji Media Holdings. Another company of the Fujisankei Communications Group, Nippon Cultural Broadcasting,  is a  shareholder of Fuji Media Holdings. Fuji Media Holdings has other shareholders who are not affiliated with the Fujisankei Communications Group.

Fuji TV Group
Fuji Television Network, Inc. (Broadcasting)
Fusosha Publishing, Inc. (Publishing, Information, Other)
Fujisankei Communications International, Inc. (Publishing, Information, Other)
Satellite Service (Broadcasting)
BS Fuji (Fuji Satellite Broadcasting Inc.)
FujiLand, Inc.
Kyodo Television, Ltd. (Producing)
Fuji Creative Corporation (Producing)
Fujiart, Inc. (Producing)
Happo Television, Inc. (Producing)
Fuji Lighting and Technology, Inc. (Producing)
Dinos, Inc. (Life Information)
Fuji TV Flower Center (Life Information)
Fujipacific Music, Inc. (Film Music)
Fujimic, Inc. (Publishing, Information, Other)

Pony Canyon Group
Pony Canyon, Inc. (Film Music)

Nippon Broadcasting Group (Nippon Hoso Group)
Nippon Broadcasting System, Inc. (Broadcasting)
Nippon Broadcasting Projects, Inc. (Publishing, Information, Other)
Fujisankei Agency (Publishing, Information, Other)

Sankei Shimbun Group
The Sankei Shimbun Co., Ltd. - Sankei Shimbun and Sankei Sports
Nihonkogyo Shimbun Company Limited - Fujisankei Business i
Sankei Shimbun Kaihatsu, Inc. (Tokyo)
Sankei Shimbun Kaihatsu, Inc. (Osaka)
Sankei Advertising, Inc.
Osaka Broadcasting Corporation

Living Shimbun Group
Sankei Living Shimbun Inc. (Life Information)
LIVING PRO-SEED, INC. (Life Information)

Sankei Building Group
Sankei Building Co., Ltd.

Culture Broadcasting Group (Bunka Hoso Group)
Nippon Cultural Broadcasting, Inc.
Japan Central Music Limited
QR Center Inc.

Art / Art Group (Public-interest corporation Group)
Hakone Open-Air Museum
The Utsukushi-ga-hara Open-air Museum
The Ueno Royal Museum

References

External links

 
Japanese companies established in 1967
Mass media companies of Japan
Keiretsu
Multinational companies headquartered in Japan
Fuyo Group
Conglomerate companies of Japan